is a Japanese actress and voice actress from Saitama. Inami is currently affiliated with Sony Music Artists. She is best known for her role as Chika Takami in Love Live! Sunshine!!

Biography
Inami graduated from Yoyogi Animation School. She aspired to become a voice actress after watching the anime series Clannad.

Inami won the second Grand Prix of Sony Music Artists' Anistoteles in 2012. While Inami was working as a stage actress, she debuted as a voice actress in a short animation Hinata no Aoshigure.

Inami was a Love Live! and μ's fan prior to her professional involvement with the franchise, even having balloted for (and attended) a μ's concert. Inami was introduced to Love Live! when a friend showed her Love Live! School Idol Festival. Inami was later cast as the main character, Chika Takami, in the series' successor Love Live! Sunshine!!. Along with eight other members, Inami is part of its idol group Aqours and sub-unit  along with Shūka Saito (voice of You Watanabe) and Ai Furihata (voice of Ruby Kurosawa). Inami is nicknamed "Anchan" by both fans and fellow Aqours members.

Inami had an online radio show titled  which aired between April and June 2016 on AG-ON.
 In November 2016, it was announced that Inami would be one of the permanent hosts of the Love Live! Sunshine!! radio program along with Arisa Komiya and Aika Kobayashi.

Filmography

Anime
Animegatari as Erika
Animegataris as Erika Aoyama
Build Divide -#FFFFFF (Code White)- as Melissa
Genjitsu no Yohane: Sunshine in the Mirror as Chika Takami
Our love has always been 10 centimeters apart as Student A
Love Live! Sunshine!! as Chika Takami
Sonny Boy & Dewdrop Girl as Hinata
Wonder Momo (web anime) as Yumi Fujita
You Can Enjoy! (web anime) as Aizujidori, Kawamatashamo

Games
Azur Lane as Isokaze, Noshiro
BATON=RELAY as Akari Koen
Brown Dust as Yuri
Duel Masters PLAY'S as Churin
Granblue Fantasy as Aqours Second-Years
Heaven Burns Red as Megumi Aikawa
Koku no Ishtaria (Age of Ishtaria) as Lancelot, Yoichi, Isola
Lemuria ~Strada of Chain~ as Aoi
Love Live! School Idol Festival as Chika Takami
Monster Strike as Watson, Lindwurm
Nyangrila as Natasha
Shadowverse as Chika Takami, Mechaboomerang Elf, Moonlight Vampire, Sweetwing Seraph
Shooting Girls as Remi Yonehira
To Heart: Heartful Party  as Hina Mitsuhoshi
Tokyo 7th Sisters as Jedah Diamond

Dubbing
Creeped Out as Narrator
Domovoy as Alina
Dreambuilders as Minna
Pitch Perfect (Parco/Happinet edition) as Becca
Spider-Man: Homecoming as Cindy

Stage

Radio
Inami Anju no Hachamecha Mechamecha Ii Desu ka!? (2016, AG-ON)
Love Live! Sunshine!! Aqours Uranohoshi Jogakuin Radio!! (2016 – present, Hibiki Radio Station)
Appare Inami! Ichimei-sama Yattemāsu (2018 – present, MBS Radio)
Ami to Anju no Dinner Time (2018, Niconico Live)
Town Radio (2018 – 2021, SMA VOICE)
Inami Anju no Radio Curtain Call (2018 – present, Chō! A&G+)

Discography

As Chika Takami

References

External links
Official blog 
Official website 
Anju Inami's profile at Sony Music Artists 

1996 births
Living people
Aqours members
Japanese stage actresses
Japanese video game actresses
Japanese voice actresses
Voice actresses from Saitama Prefecture
21st-century Japanese actresses
21st-century Japanese singers
21st-century Japanese women singers